Lieutenant General Devendra Pratap Pandey (born 17 June 1964) UYSM, AVSM, VSM is an Indian Army general serving as the current Commandant of the Army War College, Mhow, prior to his appointment he was the General-Officer-Commanding of the Srinagar-based Chinar Corps. He took over from Lieutenant General B. S. Raju after the latter completed his term as the Corps Commander. Prior to his appointment as the Chinar Corps Commander, the general served as the Director General of Territorial Army  of the Indian Army.

Early life and education 
Pandey was born in a Saryupreen Brahmin family and hails from Gorakhpur and is an alumnus of St Mary's Carmel, Kendriya Vidyalaya Airforce Station, Gorakhpur, Kendriya Vidyalaya, IIT New Delhi and National Defence Academy, Khadakwasla Pune and Indian Military Academy, Dehradun. He also holds a master's degree in defence studies from University of Madras, Chennai and an M.Phil. in defence and management studies from Devi Ahilya Vishwavidyalaya, Indore. Pandey has attended the Defence Services Staff College, Wellington, and the National Defense University in Washington, D.C.

Career 
Pandey was commissioned into 9th battalion The Sikh Light Infantry on 14 Dec 1985. He has served in Counter-insurgency operations in Jammu and Kashmir. Qualified in high altitude warfare courses, he has commanded the 9th battalion The Sikh Light Infantry in north Siachen glacier and chushul sector of Eastern Ladakh. He also commanded a RR Sector. He also served as a military observer in Cambodia.

Pandeyhas held numerous staff assignments which include a tenure as brigade major of an infantry brigade in high-altitude area during operation Vijay (Kargil) and as a director in Infantry Directorate and also Director, Foreign Division in MI  Directorate, IHQ of MoD (Army), BGS (Ops) at HQ Western Command, Chandimandir and BGS at Chetak Corps. 

In addition, he served as an assistant adjutant and instructor at the National Defence Academy, Pune.
General officer has an extensive service experience along western borders, deserts of Rajasthan and Punjab.

General officer
Promoted to the rank of major general, Pandey was appointed general officer commanding [[Rashtriya Rifles
|Counter Insurgency Force-K]] (Kilo Force)]] in the Kashmir Valley. He then served as the Additional Director General of Public Information (ADGPI) at Army Headquarters. In the rank of Lieutenant General, he was the first Director General of Territorial Army (DGTA).

XV Corps Commander
On 17 March 2021, Pandey was appointed the General officer commanding XV Corps in Srinagar. XV Corps, also known as Chinar Corps, is responsible for military operations in the Kashmir valley.

Nation-first approach

23 years home coming
The Indian army celebrated 23 years of homecoming of the 23 boys who were brought back from the clutches of militants in 1998. Army in its outreach program to felicitate these 23 individuals tried to send across a message to the youth of the Kashmir valley to shun the path of violence and come back to the mainstream. On August 23, 1998, a group of 23 young Kashmiri boys was rescued while they were attempting to cross the LoC in the Gurez sector of Bandipora district. These boys were then reunited with their parents to join the mainstream at Badami Bagh Cantonment  in presence of the civil administration.

Chillai Kalan
Chinar Corps organized annual Chillai Kalan Festival on Wednesday at the Batpura sports stadium, Shopian. This year was dedicated to the memory of CDS Gen Bipin Rawat and others who died in the accident on 8 December 21.
The much anticipated event, which coincides with the ongoing nationwide celebrations of the ‘Swarnim Vijay Varsh’, was well received and witnessed a large footfall of more than 2000 locals from Shopian & Pulwama districts.
Speaking at the event, Lt Gen DP Pandey, GOC Chinar Corps dedicated this year's festival to the memory of CDS Gen Bipin Rawat and 12 other brave soldiers and countrymen whom the nation recently lost in a tragedy. He complimented the whole hearted participation of youth, women and elderly in the event. He appealed to the youth to continue striving for an educated Kashmiri society and contribute in bringing development and peace to the region.

Swarnim Vijay Mashaal
The Prime Minister lit four Swarnim Vijay Mashaals or Victory Flames on 16 Dec 20 at the National War Memorial, New Delhi. The Flame's journey in 15 Corps Zone (15 Jun to 20 Jul 21) started with its reception at the newly constructed Navyug Tunnel. The Flame was led into the picturesque Kashmir valley by civilians and witnessed a massive enthusiastic response from Kashmir citizens, youth, children, Veer Naris/Matas, ESM, school teachers and NCC cadets.
Lieutenant General DP Pandey noted it was encouraging to see an overwhelming response from the people in Kashmir to the victory flame as it was carried around several places in the Valley, including in the Srinagar city.

White collared terrorists
Pandey insisted Kashmiris to continue to strive hard to maintain peace and prosperity in J&K despite the presence of evil minds that enforce violence on Kashmiri society. The society need to break the cycle of violence. He called upon the Kashmiri society to target OGW network that pollutes the impressionable minds of the youth to sustain terrorism in J&K. He asked community leaders to caution the youth about these instigators & their evil plans that is putting J&K on troubled paths. There are also present some vulture journalists who misguide the youths. We all need to be aware of their malintentions.

Hybrid terrorist
With the challenge for security forces in the Kashmir valley in the form of hybrid terrorism, Lt Gen D P Pandey cautioned the Kashmiri society to be more vigilant of these ‘part-time’ terrorists. They influence & corrupt the youths’ ideology. He reiterated to continue efforts to recognize such people in the valley. Young people thought process should be towards peace and development.

Tri- Service exercise
The corps conducted a helicopter-borne training and validation exercise in sub-zero temperature in the higher reaches of Kashmir Valley on Tuesday. This was a tri-service exercise undertaken with the Indian Air Force, Navy, and Army planned to validate the joint capability to insert the task force tactically behind enemy lines in an intense air defence and electronic warfare operating environment. 
Pandey said, "It is important to ensure that our capabilities are correct. Therefore, we took out the time to enhance, ensure and validate our capabilities. It's a great event because all three services have participated in it."
The successful conduct of the mission validated the true spirit of jointness achieved in planning, utilization of resources, and accomplishment of laid down mission objectives as a true reflection of the tri-service ethos of the Indian Armed Forces.

Re-enactment of Budgam landing
As part of celebration for Azadi ka Amrit Mahotsav and 75th year of air landed operations of Indian Army at Budgam Airport, a re-enactment of history covering the violation of ‘Standstill Agreement’ by Pakistan, followed by arrival of Indian Army on 27 October 1947 to evict Pakistani Forces was carried out. The Budgam landings are the first military operations of Independent India, when Indian Army was inducted by Indian Air Force at Budgam Airport on 27 October 1947.

Re-enactment of Battle of Shalateng
Lt Gen DP Pandey acknowledged the bravery of the Indian Army that fought in areas unknown to protect the honor of undefended, the brave pilots of Indian Air Force who landed at a very short strip without reconnaissance, knowledge of the terrain & in the face of the enemy and also of soldiers of Jammu & Kashmir State Forces, who sacrificed their lives to delay the advance of Pakistan Army even though being out numbered. As part of celebration for ‘Azadi ka Amrit Mahotsav’ and to commemorate the historic victory of the Indian Armed Forces in its first war after independence a [re-enactment of Battle of Shalateng] was held at Shalateng on 07 Nov 2021.
The re-enactment of the ‘Battle of Shalateng’ in the form of light and sound show was a fitting tribute to the brave soldiers and the people of J&K who ultimately defeated the Pakistan Army which had unleashed plunder, loot, mass rape, and destruction of property and houses of Kashmiris. The replica of the historic event was also in honour of the families of heroes who participated in the 1947-48 War.

For the women

International Women Equality Day
International Women Equality Day was celebrated by releasing a music video ‘Beti’ by famous Kashmiri singer and composer Waqar Khan on 26 Aug 21. The occasion commemorated achievements of Kashmiri women in various professions and roles. Many women achievers of Kashmir graced the occasion. Chinar Corps celebrated International Women Equality Day by releasing a music video ‘Beti’ by famous Kashmiri singer and composer Waqar Khan.
Gen DP Pandey, GOC 15 Corps felicitated the guests and performers, he later spoke at length on various Kashmiri women who have led from the front and shaped history of Kashmir. While women are the nurturers, they are wiser when it comes to deciding what is best for her family and progeny, and hence the society and nation. He shared ultimately it is the women who decide how a society and nation moves. He counted on the women of Kashmir to expose and oppose the duplicitous who misguide our youth while their own progeny flourish.

Doru Women's Cricket tournament
Doru Women's Cricket League 2021 was organised at the Doru cricket Stadium on 30 Aug 21 with eight teams from North and South Kashmir competing in the tournament. Mr Yousuf Pathan, former Indian Cricketer, presided over the inaugural match. The event drew enthusiastic response from the general population. The endeavor cemented the soldiers’ image as ‘Guardians Angels’ image by the women of Kashmir.

Cycle rally
An exclusive Women's Cycle Rally was organized at Baramulla on 12 Sep 21. The  cycle rally started from Baramulla and terminated at Line of Control near Kaman Aman Setu, Uri. 140 women from across the country pedalled all the way from Baramulla. 40 Kashmiri girls also participated in the arduous 65 km rally.

Kashmir Super 50 (Medical)
Pandey inaugurated the first batch of Army HPCL Kashmir Super 50 (Medical), a coaching initiative for girls for medical entrance exams. Gen Pandey said that in an attempt for women empowerment many initiatives are being taken and such an initiative gives wings to the dreams of the girl child and wins the faith of their parents towards the Army.

Citizen soldier connect

Tiranga Revolution
UT Administration through the Security Review Meeting forums and engaging secretary level functionaries along with grass-root public participation ushered in ‘Tiranga Revolution’. The Tricolor was dedicated to the people of J&K by Shri Manoj Sinha, Hon’ble Lt Governor of J&K in the presence of GOC 15 Corps. Apart from this, Tricolor was hoisted at Kupwara, Awantipur, Shopian, Gulmarg and various Government offices and school giving a sense of ‘One Nation One Flag’.

Festivals
Lt Gen D P Pandey endeavoured to reinforce the pride amongst the people of Kashmir in their own cultural festivals by organizing functions for Wular festival, Bangus mela, Doodpathri festival, Keran mela and many others.

Medical assistance

Artificial limbs
In co-operation with Jaipur-based NGO, Bhagwan Mahavir Viklang Sahayata Samiti (BMVSS), Artificial Limb fitment and assistance camps were organised for especially abled persons in 15 Corps Zone from 06 to 19 Oct 21. The joint venture between the Indian Army and Jaipur Foot Foundation was themed ‘Saksham Hum, Saksham Kashmir, Saksham Bharat’.
Lt Gen DP Pandey complimented the NGO, Bhagwan Mahavir Viklang Sahayata Samiti for its noble efforts. He emphasised that the artificial limbs would further invigorate the specially abled citizens to lead an enabled and empowered life. The camp has enabled and empowered specially abled Kashmiri citizens including children.

Covid hospital
To combat the surge of COVID-19 cases in Apr 2021 in Kashmir and to prepare of the anticipated third wave of COVID-19, a 50-bed COVID-19 facility was established and dedicated to the citizens of Kashmir. It will augment the infrastructure against the pandemic.

Oxygen plant
A non-operational oxygen plant (Enn Dee Gases) with a capacity of filling 700 cylinders of oxygen per day, located at Rangreth was resuscitated by Chinar Corps. On the UT Administration's request, Chinar Corps co-opted IAF to transport the required spare parts from Mumbai. A team of technicians from 15 Corps Zone Workshop, Rangreth along with civil technicians made the plant serviceable within four days.
Oxygen plant of Enn Dee was lying out of action for last five years. It has the capacity of filling 700 cylinders of oxygen per day. It was vital to make this plant serviceable to increase the oxygen production capacity in the valley.

Guide them young

Digitization of class rooms
Indian Army in collaboration with Power Grid Corporation of India Limited (PGCIL) as the corporate social responsibility partner and iDreams as the project implementation partner, had undertaken the project of upgradation and digitization of classrooms in 10 AGSs of Kashmir Valley.
Lt Gen DP Pandey inaugurated “Digitization of 10 Army Goodwill Schools (AGSs) of Kashmir Valley” at AGS, Boniyar on 27 Sep 2021. While addressing staff & students, he said that with digitization of the AGSs, the students shall greatly benefit as they shall have access to modern learning tools and techniques.
The project included 128 classrooms being provided with interactive boards, IT paraphernalia and  Data Tabs, intended to revolutionise the teaching process by going beyond the realms of traditional style.

Parivar School
Lt Gen D P Pandey appreciated the noble step taken by the Indrani Balan Foundation for the people of Baramulla, which led to building of new infrastructure for the Parivaar School to facilitate a conducive learning environment for the specially abled children.  More than 150 families of Baramulla district will be benefitted by this school. 
The curriculum of the school has been created keeping in mind the type and degree of disability of the students. The building has been designed taking into account the needs of the students including specially abled friendly washrooms.  More than 150 families of Baramulla district will be benefited by this school.

National Cadet Corps
Lt Gen D P Pandey facilitated the introduction of NCC camps in the remote bowls of Machhal, Keran & Gurez sectors. In addition, NCC camp were organized for the first time in Tangdhar and there are plans in pipeline to revive and expand NCC's foot prints across the valley.

Kashmir Premiere League (KPL) 2021
Under the flagship of Chinar Corps, Kashmir Premiere League 2021 was organized that engaged the youth, provided them a pedestal to showcase their talent and promote sports in the Valley. This wide reaching, multi-phased cricket tournament engaged 10 districts of Kashmir and elicited participation by nearly 3000 youth from 200 different teams. 
The tournament shed tremendous insight into the outstanding cricketing skills, excellent sportsmanship and talent among the Kashmiri youth and highlighted the synergy between Civil Administration, JKCA and the Army. Mr Yusuf Pathan, ex India cricketer gave away the prizes.

Education and sports

MoU with Kashmir University

Under Lt Gen D P Pandey, an MoU has been signed between University of Kashmir and Chinar Corps on 08 Nov 2021 for provision of distance education courses to soldiers presently serving in Kashmir. 18 courses are presently on offer and range from six months certificate courses to one year diploma courses and two year post graduate courses.
Lt Gen Pandey praised the milestone achieved in the field of education, which will empower the soldiers of the Chinar Corps in performing their duties in a challenging environment.  He said the University of Kashmir, with its rich heritage, culture and academia, will provide a one of a kind opportunity for Army personnel and civil defence employees of Chinar Corps to pursue higher educational qualifications, domain specialisation and subject matter expertise.

MoU with Mewar University
A total of 76 students of the Kashmir valley have been sponsored under Sadhbhavana Program for higher education for the students of Kashmir at Mewar University. The courses being offered are B Tech, B Pharma, BSc Agriculture and Diploma in ECG/ Med Lab/ Dialysis. The total fees of the courses range from Rs 1.6 to 2.4 lakh/year, of which 50% of the fees is being borne under Sadbhavana Program.
Addressing the students, Lt Gen D P Pandey encouraged them to utilise the opportunity and become productive citizens of the society. He emphasised on the importance of a good academic platform and able instructional staff, which in the present instance are being provided by the Mewar University.

Wushu martial arts championship
An open championship in Wushu Martial Arts was conducted on 14 & 15 Sep 21 at Manasbal lake. The event witnessed 279 x boys and girls participating in the events.
The championship was aimed at providing exposure to the budding young champions. The participants had exposure in learning & sharpening their skills. The participants, their parents and local populace were very happy to see such a big level tournament in which boys and girls participated together to promote the spirit of sports.

Dhruva Bike Rally
To commemormate the 22nd year of victory in Kargil war, HQ Northern Command conducted a two-day Dhruva Kargil Rally to commemorate Kargil Vijay Diwas. Lt Gen YK Joshi, GOC-in-C, Northern Command led the Rally.

Clean Dal & Jhelum Campaigns
‘Save Dal’ and ‘Clean Jhelum’ Campaigns were organized to promote eco-conservation. A number of events like ‘Shikara race’, a bike rally for ‘ Clean Dal’, and speed-boat rally carrying the National Flags were held. The campaign garnered massive local participation and respect for the Army.

Later career
Pandey was appointed as the Commandant of the Army War College, Mhow in April 2022 and took over on 09 May 2022.

Honours and decorations 
He has been awarded the Uttam Yudh Seva Medal (2022), Ati Vishisht Seva Medal (2020), Vishist Seva Medal (2011), and the COAS and GOC - in - C commendation card for his service.

Dates of rank

References 

Recipients of the Ati Vishisht Seva Medal
National Defence Academy (India) alumni
Indian generals
1964 births
Living people
Recipients of the Uttam Yudh Seva Medal
Recipients of the Vishisht Seva Medal
Commandants of Army War College, Mhow
Defence Services Staff College alumni
National Defense University alumni